Dragons' Den is a reality television program format in which entrepreneurs pitch their business ideas to a panel of venture capitalists in the hope of securing investment finance from them. The program originated in 2001 in Japan, where it is known as The Tigers of Money, a pun on "The Tiger of Malaya", which was the nickname of WWII general Tomoyuki Yamashita. The format was created and is owned by Nippon TV and is distributed by Sony Pictures Television.

Local versions of the show have been produced in nearly 30 countries, as well as one for the Arab world; in some countries, more than one version has been aired. The first version to air outside of Japan was the British programme Dragons' Den, which launched in 2005; in the several years afterward, most versions named themselves Dragons' Den or variations thereof, though some also used other animals in the title, such as lions. Since the launch of the U.S. version of the show, Shark Tank, in 2009, many versions have been named Shark Tank or variations thereof. In versions where the name of the show contains a creature's name, the investors are referred to by that name.

Format
The contestants are usually inventors, product designers, or service operators who have what they consider to be a viable and potentially very profitable business idea, but who lack funding and/or business acumen. They pitch their idea to five rich entrepreneurial businesspeople, who in most iterations of the show are referred to as "dragons", "tigers" (in the original Japanese show), "lions" or "sharks". Before the show, the contestants have named a specific amount of money that they wish to get along with a percentage in the business that the contestant is offering to sell to the investors. The rules stipulate that if they do not raise at least this amount from the dragons, they get nothing. In return, the contestant gives the dragons a percentage of the company's capital stock, which is the chief point of negotiation. The program does not show the entire pitch as scenes are selected and edited from the episode due to time constraints.

The dragons probe the idea further once the contestant has made the presentation. This will either reveal a sound business proposition resulting in an investment offer from one or more of the dragons in return for equity or a withdrawal from the transaction by either the contestant or all of the dragons. A rejection by the dragons is often given as "I'm out" which is usually triggered (in the investor's opinion) by the investor asking for a larger equity stake in the business than the contestant wants to give up, the contestant's valuation on the business being too high compared to its overall profits, the product not having any proprietary value, or the investor's belief that they cannot add value to the business. Sometimes the dragons identify troubling facts such as an embarrassing lack of preparation on the part of the contestant, the contestant's lack of business knowledge, their perceived margins, competitors, insufficient sales, or high manufacturing costs. Contestants often negotiate and barter with the investors. The deals agreed to on the program may or may not actually be carried through.

Versions 
Dragons' Den series have been produced in numerous countries. Apart from Japan (where the show debuted) the show names, structures, and styles are based upon the UK version.

Afghanistan 

In Afghanistan, the show is called Fikr wa Talash (Dream and Achieve). The show's purpose is to encourage Afghans to embark on entrepreneurship. It aimed to promote entrepreneurial spirit among ordinary Afghans, with the show giving contestants a lifetime opportunity to pitch their creative business ideas before a panel of business tycoons and walk away with the cash prize of US$20,000.

The show began in 2008 on TOLO TV. The first series ended in August 2008, with the final contestant, Faizulhaq Moshkani, winning $20,000 towards his plastic recycling business. At the time of the show, he owned a plastic recycling plant in Qandahar in southern Afghanistan. After winning, Moshkani shut the factory due to the high cost of fuel to power generators. Instead, he used the $20,000 prize money to move the business to Kabul, where he planned to build a miniature hydroelectric plant to power the new recycling plant. Mariam Al Ahmadi collected the runner-up prize of $10,000.
In the second season, a follow-up episode was introduced with the top contestants tracking their progress in their businesses.

The show was produced by Bamyan media with the help of the Moby Group's strategic communications arm, Lapis Ltd, and aired on the Group's most popular channel in Afghanistan, TOLO TV, reaching an estimated 7 million viewers in 2010.

Fikr wa Talash was sponsored by USAID, Roshan telecommunication (the country's leading mobile operator) and Bank e Milli (Afghan National Bank). The host is Ramiz Baktiar. Like the Egyptian version, it was created by Anna Elliot, founder of the NGO Bamyan Media.

Arab world 
In the Arab world, Dragons' Den was known as Dragons' Den: Al Aareen العرين (The Den). It was broadcast on the Lebanese channel Future Television and was hosted by Ibrahim Abu Jawdeh. The show received contestants from various Arab countries.

The panel of Dragons for the 2007 series consisted of:
 Omar El-Quqa
 Ahmad Tantash
 Nassif Karam
 Roger Azar

Egypt 
The Egyptian version of Dragons' Den is El Mashroua ("The Project"). The show was created in 2013 by Anna Elliot, the founder of the NGO Bamyan Media. It was broadcast on the national channel Alnahar and followed by approximately four million people. The program created the largest community of entrepreneurs through a digital platform connected to the show with one million participants. The winner of the first season, Tina Boules, won the sum of 350,000 Egyptian pounds to develop her startup Taqa Solutions, which specializes in agricultural waste recycling and biogas exploitation.
The panel of Dragons consisted of :
 Hala Hattab
 Hisham Al Jamal

Australia

Dragons' Den (2005 version)
The Australian version of Dragons' Den was broadcast on the Seven Network and hosted by Andrew O'Keefe. Unlike in other versions, the host ran through the outline of the business with the contestant before the contestant began negotiating with the Dragons for a deal. The show was produced by Michael Horrock. The Australian Dragons were:

Peter Higgins
Sarina Russo
Darryn Lyons
Suzi Dafnis
Siimon Reynolds

The Seven Network announced in December 2005 that the show would not be back for a second season after poor ratings.

Shark Tank (2015 version)

The format was revived by Network Ten, under the American Shark Tank name, for a show that premiered February 2015. It ran for four seasons, until August 2018. The show was hosted by Sarah Harris. The Sharks for this edition are:
 Janine Allis (founder of Boost Juice)
 Andrew Banks (founder of Talent2)
 Steve Baxter (entrepreneur, investor, internet pioneer)
 Naomi Simson (founder of RedBalloon)
 John McGrath (founder of McGrath Estate Agents) (season 1)
 Glen Richards (Greencross Vets) (seasons 2–4)

Austria 
The Austrian version is called  ("2 Minutes 2 Million"). It debuted on Puls 4 in 2013, and has run for 9 seasons so far.

The investors have been:

Belgium 
The Belgian version, which is in Flemish, is called Leeuwenkuil ("Lions' Den"). It ran for one season in 2018 on VIER. It was hosted by Eve Gruyaert.

The investors were:
 Bart Deconinck
 
 Luc Van Mol
 
 Bart Verhaeghe

Brazil 
The Brazilian version is called : Negociando com Tubarões ("Negotiating with Sharks"). It debuted in October 2016. The "sharks" have been:

Guest investors have included Carlos Wizard Martins, Roberto Justus, Luiza Trajano, Caio Castro and others.

Canada

English version 
The English-language Canadian version of Dragons' Den began airing in 2006.

The Canadian Dragons were:

French version 
The French-language version,  ("In the Dragon's Eye"), began airing in 2012, hosted by Paul Houde. It has run for 11 seasons.

Past and present dragons include:
 Dany Vachon — co-founder of Impera Advisory Inc, PVG Partners LLC and Fusion Immunovative/NVNC
  — president and founder of Danièle Henkel Inc
 François Lambert — co-founder of Aheeva and Atelka
  — executive chairman of Publipage
  (Canadian Grand Prix, Just for Laughs)
 Alexandre Taillefer (Stingray Digital, Téo Taxi, Voir, L'Actualité, etc.)
 Serge Beauchemin
 Martin-Luc Archambault
 Mitch Garber

China 
The Chinese version of Dragons' Den (中国合伙人 "Chinese Partner") started airing in May 2016 on Shenzhen Satellite TV. The Chinese format is produced by Shanghai-based IPCN (International Programme International Network).

Past and present Chinese Dragons include:

 Bob Xu, co-founder of New Oriental Education and ZhenFund (season 1–2)
 Annabelle Long Yu, CEO of Bertelsmann China (season 1–2)
 Li Guoqing, co-founder & CEO of Dang Dang (season 1–2)
 Yao Jinbo, Founder & CEO of 58.com (season 1–2)
 Hugo Shong, chairman of IDG Greater China (season 1)
 Zhou Hongyi, co-founder and CEO of Qihoo 360 (season 1)
 Jerry Huang, founder and CEO of Gaudi Capital (season 2)

Colombia
The Colombian version, called , began airing on 23 February 2018 on Canal Sony.

The Colombian sharks have been:

In addition, Jean Claude Bessudo was a guest investor in the first season.

Croatia 
The Croatian version of Dragons' Den called  (Dragon's Nest) was scheduled to broadcast in May 2007 on Croatian Radiotelevision and produced by Ocean Film, a local production company.

Contracted Croatian Dragons were:

 Maja Pečarević — owner of Generalturist, the leading and oldest travel agency in Croatia.
 Hrvoje Prpić — owner of Smee d.o.o, bamboo flooring company.
 Davor Štern — owner of Trade Consulting d.o.o., business consulting company.
 Juroslav Buljubašić — co-owner of Blue Line International, the international maritime company.
 Branko Roglić — owner of Orbico, one of the leading importers and distributors of various consumer goods and toys in Croatia.

A few episodes were filmed but never broadcast for undisclosed reasons.

Czech Republic 
In the Czech Republic, the show is called Den D (The D-Day).

It first aired on 31 March 2009 on ČT1, in a very similar set up to the British version of BBC.

The show is hosted by radio host Jan Pokorny and the dragon investors are:

 Ivan Pilny – former general manager of Microsoft in the Czech Republic, chairman of the board of Czech Telecom and entrepreneur (Series 1 & 3)
 Marta Novakova – founder and CEO of U&SLUNO software company (Series 1, 2 & 3)
 Ondrej Bartos – serial entrepreneur, consultant and venture capitalist, Partner with Credo Ventures (Series 1 & 2)
 Dana Berova – former minister of informatics, entrepreneur and business development director of Gartner (1st, 2nd & 3rd series)
 Tomio Okamura – Czech-Japanese entrepreneur in travel and retail (Series 1, 2 & 3)
 Michael Rostock – investment banker and advisor with Venture Investors Corporate Finance (Series 2 & 3)

The Dragons are/were:

Denmark 
A Danish version of the show,  (The Lion's Den), began airing in April 2015.

The "lions" have been:

Finland

Lion's Mouth (2007) 
The show began running on 27 September 2007 on the MTV3 channel and aired for one season. It was hosted by Anna Sorainen. The local  (lions) were Kyösti Kakkonen, Eero Lehti, Toivo Sukari, Lisa Sounio and Kaija Ward.

Lion's Den (2013) 
In February 2013 the show re-emerged on the Nelonen channel, this time named  (Lion's Den). The show was hosted by Kirsi Salo, and the new lions were Riku Asikainen, Jorma Terentjeff, Ari Lahti, Anne Berner and Oskari Lehtonen.

France 
The French version is called Qui veut être mon associé? ("Who wants to be my business partner?"). It debuted on 14 January 2020 on M6. The second season premiered on 5 January 2022. The third season premiered on 4 January 2023.

The investors have been:

Germany 
The German version is called  ("The Lions' Den"). It debuted on 19 August 2014 on VOX. The second season premiered on 18 August 2015. The third season premiered on 23 August 2016.

The German "lions" have been:

Guest investors on the show have included Anne & Stefan Lemcke, Sarna Röser and Diana zur Löwen.

Greece 
The Greek version of Dragons' Den Greece began airing on 26 January 2023 on ANT1 and hosted by Sakis Tanimanidis.

The Greek Dragons are:
 Haris Vafias — Shipowner
 Paul Eumorphidis — Coco-Mat Founder
 Lily Perganda — Founder & President of Power Health
 Maria Hatzistefani — Founder & President of The Rodial Group
 Leon Yohai — Tech Investor

Hungary 
The Hungarian version is called Cápák között (Among Sharks). It debuted on 18 February 2019 on RTL.

The Hungarian "sharks" are/were:

India 

An Indian version of the show began in 2021 on SET India. It is hosted by Rannvijay Singha (Season 1) and Rahul Dua (Season 2).

The seven sharks who participated in season 1 and new shark was introduced in season 2 are:

Ireland 

An Irish version of the show, Dragons' Den, ran for eight seasons, from 2009 to 2017, on RTÉ One, the state broadcaster. It was presented by Richard Curran, deputy editor of The Sunday Business Post.

The first season premiered on 19 February 2009. The third season premiered on 20 February 2011. Starting at the end of the third season, some episodes showed the dragons on tour visiting their past investments. For the fourth series of Dragons' Den, a live, interactive "Sixth Dragon Game" was developed to be played whilst watching the show, in which viewers are able to decide in real time if they're "in" or "out" as the pitches unfold. It was the first live, interactive game for a TV show in Ireland.

The Irish Dragons were:

Israel 

In Israel, Dragons' Den is entitled  ("The Sharks"). It was produced by Gil Productions and was originally broadcast for two seasons on the now defunct Channel 10. It was hosted by Guy Zohar. The first two seasons feature six "sharks" who rotate their appearance weekly. The first season was broadcast during the summer and fall of 2006 and the second during the summer of 2007.

In 2018 the show was renewed by Gil Productions and is now broadcast on Keshet 12, where it has aired for three seasons. The show's Keshet 12 iteration features a mostly new cast, although Amir Eyal from the original iteration returned for the 3rd season. A 2023 investigation by TheMarker of seasons 2-3 of the production showed that less than a quarter of ideas picked up by the "sharks" actually receive funding, with others losing time, money and reputation due to their participation in the show.

Japan 
Titled , this is the original version. It was created by and broadcast on Nippon Television from 2001 to 2004. It was the first entertainment programme in the history of Japanese television that dealt with the concept of business investment. During its three-year run, as many as 16 business executives appeared in the programme as Tigers.

Kenya 
The premier of Lion's Den was in October 2016 on NTV. The show was sponsored by KCB Group, the largest commercial bank in East Africa. The format was introduced to Kenya by Quite Bright Films Kenya Ltd (QBF) who produce the show in Nairobi.

The Kenyan Lions are:
 Darshan Chandaria, director and Group CEO of Chandaria group
 Kris Senanu, venture capitalist and MD, Telkom Digital
 Myke Rabar, entertainment Guru and Founder, CEO of Homeboyz Entertainment Group
 Olive Gachara, businesswoman in fashion, image consultant and Editor in Chief of Couture Africa Magazine
 Wandia Gichuru, businesswoman with own fashion lines and stores

Mexico 
In Mexico the series is called Shark Tank México: Negociando con tiburones or just simply , Spanish for "Negotiating with Sharks".

The sharks were:

 Ana Victoria García (season 1) Victoria 147 Women's entrepreneur incubator and training
 Arturo Elías Ayub (season main 1–2, 3 guest) Director of Strategic Alliances at Telmex
 Carlos Bremer (season 1–3) Owner Grupo Financiero Value Stock Brokerage firm 
 Jorge Vergara (season 1–2) Omnilife nutraceuticals and Anhelo movie production
 Rodrigo Herrera Aspra es (season 1–3) CEO Genomma Labs OTC drugs and skin lotions
 Patricia Armendáriz (season 2–3) Politician, actuary and business consultant
 Marcus Dantus (season 3) Startup Mexico business incubator chain
 Luis Harvey (season 3) Nexxus Private equity and investment banking

Nepal 
This series is titled Shark Tank Nepal. Himalaya Television HD  has the rights to produce and broadcast the show.

Netherlands 
In the Netherlands the show, called Dragons' Den, first ran on Nederland 3 for two seasons from 2007 to 2008. The first season was broadcast in May 2007, every Friday at 20:25. The second season was broadcast in May 2008, every Monday at 21:25. Both seasons were hosted by Jort Kelder.

The show was revived in 2020, and ran for two seasons on NPO 1. The third season, in 2020, was hosted by Sander Schimmelpenninck, and the fourth season, in 2021, was hosted by Jort Kelder. In 2022 the show aired for a fifth season on the streaming service Viaplay.

The Dutch dragons have been:

New Zealand 
Initially, the UK and Australian series of Dragons' Den were broadcast in New Zealand before a local version was produced by Eyeworks Television. It broadcast on TV One in 2006 and was hosted by Rawdon Christie. The dragons were:

 Julie Christie
 Bob Jones
 Annette Presley
 Paul Webb
 Barry Colman

Nigeria 
Nigeria's adaptation of Dragons' Den was broadcast weekly in 2008 on the AIT Network and produced by Storm Vision.

The Nigerian Dragons were:

Prince Femi Tejuoso
Ibukun Awosika
Chris Parkes
Alexander Amosu
John Momoh
Tokunboh Ishmael

Pakistan
In Pakistan, the program airs as Idea Croron Ka and is broadcast on Neo News. It is a joint venture between Chaudhry Muhammad Akram Centre for Entrepreneurship Development (CMACED) at Superior University and Neo News. The first episode premiered on 18 March 2017. The main lead and driving force of this show is Nabeel A. Qadeer who was the Director Entrepreneurship at Punjab Information Technology Board (PITB).

The judges include:

 Salim Ghauri, Founder and CEO of Netsol technologies (Pvt.) Ltd
 Naeem Zamindar, Pakistan Country Director and CEO of Acumen
 Humayun Mazhar, Founder, CEO and chairman at CresVentures

Poland 
In Poland, the program is called Dragons' Den – jak zostać milionerem ("How to be a millionaire") and was broadcast on TV4 for three seasons from 2011 to 2012. The largest investment ever secured on the program was 15 million PLN (US$5.5 million) in the show's first season, on 24 April 2011.

The Polish Dragons were:

Portugal 
The Portuguese version of Dragons' Den has the American name Shark Tank. It ran for two seasons, from 2015 to 2016, on the SIC Network.

The Portuguese Sharks are:
Mário Ferreira
João Rafael Koehler
Susana Sequeira
Tim Vieira
Miguel Ribeiro Ferreira

Romania 
A Romanian version of the format,  ("Lions' Arena"), ran for seven seasons from 2007 to 2013. The Romanian Lions were:

The show was released again in 2019 under the name  ("Lions' Empire"). The new Romanian lions have been:

Russia 
There was a Russian version of the show called KAPITAL.

Saudi Arabia 
Saudi Arabian broadcaster STV1 showed the BBC version of Dragons' Den in 2010, then broadcast a local version in 2011. It was called التجار, or "Traders". The dragons were:
 Saleh Kamel
 Ahmed Fitihy
 Nashwa Altahir
 Altaiar
 Alhalafy

Slovenia 
The Slovenian version of the show was called  ("Good Deal"). It was aired by new Slovenian broadcaster Planet TV, owned by Telekom Slovenije. The show was announced in May 2012, and premiered on 11 November 2012.

The Slovenian investors were:
 Branko Drobnak, Procurator at Alta Skupina d.d., an asset management, non-discretional brokerage services, corporate finance services, accounting and audit services company. He is part of The Business Angels Club of Slovenia and non-executive chairman of Acies bio d.o.o, a biotechnology contract research organization.
 Borut Rismal General Manager, CHS d.o.o., a computer peripherals distribution company
 Daniela Bervar Country Manager for Slovenia at Cotrugli Business School and co-owner of MEDIA LAB d.o.o. deal of the day business company.
 Jure Mikuž founder of RSG Capital, a venture-capital management company
 Matjaž Krč, a business angel and managing director at Ideus d.o.o., business consulting services for small and mid-sized companies.

South Africa 
Dragon's Den South Africa premiered on 23 September 2014 on Mzansi Magic. In a 2014 episode, Vusi Thembekwayo, one of the Dragons, signed his biggest deal, when he invested ZAR2 million in a Halaal abattoir owned by contestant Johan Jacobs and received a 40% stake in the business. There were two seasons of the show.

The South African "dragons" were:
 Lebo Gunguluza, runs Gunguluza Enterprises & Media which boasts 12 print publications, stakes in numerous hotels and a car-hire business.
 Vusi Thembekwayo, a motivational speaker and CEO of Watermark Pan-African Capital Ltd, with over ZAR4,32 billion in capital.
 Polo Leteka Radebe, CEO of Identity Partners, a small and medium enterprises advisory and fund management services firm founded in 2007 
 Vinny Lingham, a serial internet entrepreneur from Cape Town with ties to Silicon Valley.
 Gil Oved, founder and co-CEO of The Creative Counsel, an advertising agency with over ZAR600 million in turnover per year.

In October 2016 the show was renamed to Shark Tank South Africa and premiered on M-Net.

The "sharks" are:
 Dawn Nathan-Jones
 Vinny Lingham
 Romeo Kumalo
 Marnus Broodryk
 Gil Oved

Spain 

Sweden 
The Swedish version is called  ("The Dragons' Nest"). It initially ran for two seasons, in 2009 and 2010, on Sveriges Television (SVT). In 2014 it aired for one season on TV8. The series returned to SVT in 2021, when it ran for a fourth season, then a fifth season in 2022.

The Swedish Dragons have been:

Switzerland 
The Swiss version is called Die Höhle der Löwen Schweiz ("Lion's Den Switzerland") and is in German. It uses the same style, design and name as the German version. The first season premiered on May 21, 2019, on the German-speaking channel TV24. Later seasons also aired on the channel 3+.

Thailand 
In 2018, MEDIA Tank Co. Ltd. licensed Shark Tank Thailand franchise from Sony Pictures Television to be aired on Channel 7. The first season aired from 3 March to 23 June 2019. The second season aired from 5 July to 25 October 2020. The third season aired from 28 August to 27 November 2022.

Actor Shahkrit Yamnam was a guest investor in the first season; Pattarapon Sinlapajan and Prapol Milintachinda were guest investors in the second season.

Trinidad and Tobago 
The Trinbagonian version of Dragon's Den is called "Planting Seeds". The first season premiered on August 23, 2016, on CNC3. The show ran for four seasons before becoming an online sales platform called "Seed Shops".

The original four investors on the show were:

 Joseph Rahael, managing director for Real Estate at The ANSA McAL Group
 Racquel Moses, CEO at The Caribbean Climate-Smart Accelerator
 Joe Pires, managing director at Caribbean Chemicals & Agencies
 Sheldon Stephen (Managing Direction at Lollabee Group of Companies

Turkey 
The Turkish version of Dragons' Den, Dragons' Den Türkiye, aired on Bloomberg HT in 2010. The dragons were:

 Baybars Altuntaş
 Yalçın Ayaydın
 Nevzat Aydın
 
 Alphan Manas

Ukraine 
In Ukraine, the series was called  ("Business Sharks") and featured Dragons such as future presidential candidate Serhiy Tihipko.

United Kingdom 

Dragons' Den was first broadcast in the UK on 4 January 2005 on BBC Two. Since 2021, after 16 series on that channel, the show has been broadcast on BBC One, with reruns of previous episodes still broadcast on BBC Two. The producers are Darrell Olsen and Samantha Davies, and it is hosted by BBC presenter Evan Davis.

The Dragons are/were:

During filming for series 17, Touker Suleyman fell ill with pneumonia and was unable to appear on the show for the second half of the series; Theo Paphitis returned temporarily to cover his place.

In May 2021 it was confirmed that Steven Bartlett would become the youngest ever Dragon to join the den.

United States 

In 2008, television producer Mark Burnett signed a deal with format holder Sony to produce an American version of the series. The series on U.S. television is titled Shark Tank.

The U.S. network ABC ordered a pilot episode which was produced by Sony Pictures TV. On 9 October 2008, a casting producer announced that The Shark Tank was accepting applications for a pilot, giving entrepreneurs two weeks to submit their ideas. The pilot was filmed from 6 to 9 January 2009 in Los Angeles.

On 23 September 2016, Shark Tank began its eighth season. The current "sharks" are:

 Robert Herjavec, who sold his IT security firm at the height of the dot-com bubble for over $100 million. Previously appeared on the Canadian version of Dragon's Den.
 Lori Greiner, President and CEO of For Your Ease Only, as well as host of a monthly show on the QVC Network.
 Kevin O'Leary, former co-host of The Lang and O'Leary Exchange on CBC News Network, formerly president of The Learning Company, which was sold to Mattel for $3.7 billion in 1999. Previously appeared on the Canadian version of Dragon's Den.
 Barbara Corcoran, self-made real estate millionaire who sold her company The Corcoran Group for $66 million in 2001.
 Daymond John, founder of FUBU.
 Mark Cuban, owner of the basketball franchise Dallas Mavericks and billionaire entrepreneur.

For the first two seasons of the series, Kevin Harrington was a regular shark. He was replaced in the third season by Mark Cuban.

Unlike versions of the show in other countries, the U.S. version uses a rotating cast of sharks every season, of which five usually appear in each episode, although all six sharks have occasionally appeared on a single episode. Also on occasion, guest investors fill in for a regular shark on the panel. Past guest investors include:

 Jeff Foxworthy, comedian and television personality.
 Steve Tisch, chairman and Executive Vice President of the New York Giants.
 John Paul DeJoria, founder of John Paul Mitchell Systems haircare line and Patrón.
 Nick Woodman, the founder and CEO of GoPro.
 Chris Sacca, Proprietor of Lowercase Capital which made early investments in companies including Uber, Twitter, Kickstarter and Instagram.
 Ashton Kutcher, American actor and investor.
 Troy Carter, Founder, chairman and CEO of Atom Factory.
 Alex Rodriguez, retired Major League Baseball player, currently ESPN Sunday Night Baseball commentator and investor.
Jamie Siminoff, Founder of Ring Inc.
Sara Blakely, Founder of Spanx.
Rohan Oza, brand marketer.
Daniel Lubetzky, Founder of Kind (company).
Kendra Scott, Founder of Kendra Scott LLC.
Charles Barkley, Former NBA MVP and investor.  
Peter Jones, dragon on Dragons' Den
Emma Grede, CEO and co-founder of Good American and founding partner of Skims
Kevin Hart, founder of Laugh Out Loud Productions, and an actor and comedian
Nirav Tolia, co-founder of Nextdoor

Vietnam 
A Vietnamese version of the show, titled Thương vụ bạc tỷ ("billion-dollar deal"), with the English-language title Shark Tank Vietnam, has aired for five seasons on Vietnam Television, starting in 2017.

See also
American Inventor
Ath Pavura
Fortune: Million Pound Giveaway
MoneyHunt
Redemption Inc.
The Big Idea
The Profit
Win in China

References

External links
Official "Money no Tora" site (WebArchive)
 (official UK website)
Den D (official Czech Republic website)
Dragons' Den (official Polish website)
Dragons' Den (RTÉ's official Irish website)

2000s Australian reality television series
Business-related television series
Irish reality television series
Mexican reality television series
Japanese reality television series
Seven Network original programming
Television series by Sony Pictures Television
Reality television series franchises

es:Tu oportunidad